SML may refer to:

Economics
Sammarinese lira, ISO 4217 code
Security market line, a representation of the capital asset pricing model
Sistema de Pagamentos em Moeda Local, local currency payment system

Organisations and businesses
Scottish Militant Labour, 1990s Trotskyist political party
SML Isuzu, commercial vehicle manufacturer, India
Soheil Mosun, architectural manufacturer and design-build company, Toronto, Canada
Strasser Marigaux & Lemaire, French musical instrument manufacturer

Places

Buildings
Sterling Memorial Library, Yale University, New Haven, Connecticut, U.S.
St Mary's Church, Longfleet, Dorset County, England

Other places
Smith Mountain Lake, in Virginia, U.S.
South Manchester Line, a tram line of the Manchester Metrolink, U.K.

Science and technology

Computers
Standard ML, a programming language
Service Modeling Language, to allow computing applications to communicate

Other
Sea surface microlayer, the top millimeter of the ocean surface
Shoals Marine Laboratory, a seasonal marine field station on Appledore Island, Maine, U.S.

Other uses
Super Mario Land, for the Game Boy
Survey Motor Launches, decommissioned vessels of the British Royal Navy